This is a list of Catholic philosophers and theologians whose Catholicism is important to their works. The names are ordered by date of birth in order to give a rough sense of influence between thinkers.

Ancient (born before 500 AD)

Ignatius of Antioch (c. 35/50 – between 98 and 110)
Papias of Hierapolis (c. 60 – c. 163)
Polycarp of Smyrna (c. 69 – c. 155)
Justin Martyr (100–165)
Irenaeus (130–202)
Clement of Rome (died 99)
Clement of Alexandria (150–215)
Tertullian (155–222)
Origen of Alexandria (184–253)
Cyprian of Carthage (200–258)
Aphrahat (270–345)
Athanasius of Alexandria (296–373)
Hillary of Poitiers (300–368)
Ephrem the Syrian (306–373)
Basil of Caesarea (329–379) 
Gregory Nazianzus (329–390)
Gregory of Nyssa (335–395)
Ambrose (340–397)
Jerome (347–420) 
John Chrysostom (347–407) 
Augustine of Hippo (354–430)
Cyril of Alexandria (378–444)
Isaac of Antioch (451–452)
Boethius (477–524)

Early Medieval (born between 500 AD and 1100 AD)

Pope Gregory I (540-604)
Isadore of Seville (560-636)
Maximus the Confessor (580-662)
Bede (672/3-735)
John of Damascus (675/6-749)
Radbertus (785-865)
John Scotus Eriugena (800-877)
Anselm of Canterbury (1033/4-1109)
Peter Abelard (1079-1142)
Adelard of Bath (1080-1152)
Bernard of Clairvaux (1090-1153)
Peter Lombard (1096-1160)
Hildegard of Bingen (1098-1179)

High Medieval (born between 1100 AD and 1450 AD)

Robert Grosseteste (1175-1253)
Francis of Assisi (1181/2-1226)
Alexander of Hales (1185-1245)
Albertus Magnus (1193-1280)
Henry of Ghent (1217-1293)
Roger Bacon (1219/20-1292)
Bonaventure (1221-1274)
Thomas Aquinas (1225-1274)
Ramon Llull (1232-1315)
Giles of Rome (1243-1316)
Godfrey of Fontaines (1250-1306/9)
James of Viterbo (1255-1307)
Gertrude of Helfta (1256-1302)
Meister Eckhart (1260-1328)
Dante Alighieri (1265-1321)
John Duns Scotus (1266-1308)
William of Alnwick (1275-1333)
William of Ockham (1287-1347)
William of Ware (1290-1305)
Henry Suso (1295-1366)
Jean Buridan (1300-1358/61)
Bridget of Sweden (1303-1373)
Albert of Saxony (1320-1390)
Nicole Oresme (1325-1382)
Catherine of Siena (1347-1380)
Jean Gerson (1363-1429)
John Capreolus (1380-1444)
Nicholas of Cusa (1401-1464)

Renaissance and Early Modern (born between 1450 AD and 1750 AD)

Sylvester Mazzolini (1456/7-1527)
Giovanni Pico della Mirandola (1463-1494)
Desiderius Erasmus (1466-1536)
John Mair (1467-1550)
Thomas Cajetan (1469-1534)
Francesco Silvestri (1474-1528)
Thomas More (1478-1535)
John Fisher (1469-1535)
Nicolaus Copernicus (1473-1543)
Francisco de Vitoria (1483-1546)
Ignatius of Loyola (1491-1556)
Peter Faber (1506-1546)
Teresa of Ávila (1515-1582)
Michel de Montaigne (1533-1592)
Domingo Báñez (1528-1604)
Franciscus Patricius (1529-1597)
Luis de Molina (1535-1600)
John of the Cross (1542-1591)
Robert Bellarmine (1542-1621)
Justus Lipsius (1547-1606)
Francisco Suárez (1548-1617)
Lawrence of Brindisi (1559-1619)
Galileo Galilei (1564-1642)
Péter Pázmány (1570-1637)
John of St. Thomas (John Poinsot) (1589-1644)
Michael Wadding (1591-1644)
René Descartes (1596-1650)
Matthias Tanner (1630-1692)
Nicolas Malebranche (1638-1715)
Blaise Pascal (1623-1662)
Noel Alexandre (1639-1724)
Giambattista Vico (1668-1744)
Giovanni Battista Scaramelli (1687-1752)
Peter Dens (1690-1775)
Alphonsus Liguori (1696-1787)
Febronius (Johann Nikolaus von Hontheim) (1701-1790)
Francesco Antonio Zaccaria (1714-1795)

Late Modern (born between 1750 AD and 1900 AD)

Patrick Benedict Zimmer (1752-1820)
Joseph de Maistre (1753-1821)
Franz Xaver von Baader (1765-1841)
Georg Hermes (1775-1831)
Hughes Felicité Robert de Lamennais (1782-1854)
Anton Günther(1783-1863)
Izidor Guzmics (1786-1839)
Gioacchino Ventura di Raulica (1792-1861)
Luigi Taparelli (1793-1862)
Antonio Rosmini-Serbati (1797-1855)
Francis Xavier Patrizi (1797-1881)
Franz Anton Staudenmaier (1800-1856)
John Henry Newman (1801-1890)
Nicholas Wiseman (1802-1865)
Félix Dupanloup (1802-1878)
Jean-Baptiste Henri Lacordaire (1802-1861)
Orestes Brownson (1803-1876)
Alexis de Tocqueville (1805-1859)
Auguste Joseph Alphonse Gratry (1805-1872)
Giuseppe Pecci (1807-1890)
Karl Josef von Hefele (1809-1893)
Jaime Balmes (1810-1848)
Pope Leo XIII (Vincenzo Gioacchino Raffaele Luigi Pecci) (1810-1903)
Joseph Kleutgen (1811-1883)
Louis Veuillot (1813-1883)
Frederick William Faber (1814-1863)
Franz Jakob Clemens (1815-1862)
Valentin Gröne (1817–1882)
John Dobree Dalgairns (1818-1876)
Gregor Mendel (1822-1884)
Augusta Theodosia Drane (1823-1894)
Nicholas-Joseph Laforêt (1823-1872)
Albert Stöckl (1823-1895)
Joseph Hergenröther (1824-1890)
Charles Émile Freppel (1827-1891)
Constantine von Schäzler (1827-1880)
Ernest Hello (1828-1885)
Henry Nutcombe Oxenham (1829-1888)
Tommaso Maria Zigliara (1833-1893)
Franz Brentano (1838-1917)
Léon Ollé-Laprune (1839-1898)
Caspar Isenkrahe (1844-1921)
Henry Denifle (1844-1905)
Aloisio Galea (1851-1905)
Marcelino Menéndez y Pelayo (1856-1912)
Maurice Blondel (1861-1949) 
Antonin Sertillanges (1863-1948)
Henri Brémond (1865-1933)
Maurice De Wulf (1867-1947)
Paul Claudel (1868-1955)
Aleš Ušeničnik (1868-1952)
Hilaire Belloc (1870-1953)
Charles Peguy (1873-1914) 
G.K. Chesterton (1874-1936)
Max Scheler (1874-1928)
Reginald Garrigou-Lagrange (1877-1964)
Pierre Teilhard de Chardin (1881-1955)
Jacques Maritain (1882-1973)
Rudolf Allers (1883-1963) 
Étienne Gilson (1884-1978)
Romano Guardini (1885-1968)
Christopher Dawson (1889-1970)
Gabriel Marcel (1889-1973)
Martin Heidegger (1889-1976)
Dietrich von Hildebrand (1889-1977)
Oswald von Nell-Breuning (1890-1991) 
Charles Journet (1891-1975)
Edith Stein (1891-1942)
Fulton Sheen (1895-1979)
Henri de Lubac (1896-1991)
Xavier Zubiri (1898-1983)
Austin Woodbury (1899-1979)
František Tomášek (1899-1992)

Twentieth and Twenty-first Century

Heinrich Schlier (1900-1978) 
Jean Guitton (1901-1999)
Mortimer Jerome Adler, converted to Catholicism in 2000 (1902-2001)
Christopher Butler (1902-1986)
Józef Maria Bocheński (1902-1995)
Malcolm Muggeridge (1903-1990)
Yves Simon (1903-1961)
Evelyn Waugh (1903-1966)
Graham Greene (1904-1991)  
Josef Pieper (1904-1997)
John Courtney Murray (1904-1967)
Karl Rahner (1904-1984)
Yves Congar (1904-1995)
Osvaldo Lira (1904-1996)
Bernard Lonergan (1904-1984) 
Jean Danielou (1905-1974) 
Emmanuel Mounier (1905-1950)
Hans Urs von Balthasar (1905-1988)
Charles De Koninck (1906-1965)
Frederick Copleston (1907-1994)
Bernard Philip Kelly (1907-1958)
Bernard O'Brien (1907-1982)
Olivier Messiaen (1908-1992) 
Hélder Câmara (1909-1999)
Augusto Del Noce (1910-1989)
Cornelio Fabro (1911-1995)
Marshall McLuhan (1911-1980)
E. F. Schumacher (1911-1977)
Anna Terruwe (1911-2004) 
George Duggan (1912-2012)
Karel Vladimir Truhlar (1912-1977) 
Walter J. Ong (1912-2003)
Louis Bouyer (1913-2004) 
Nicolás Gómez Dávila (1913-1994)
R. C. Zaehner (1913-1974) 
Edward Schillebeeckx (1914-2009)
John Hardon (1914-2000)
Thomas Berry (1914-2009)
W. Norris Clarke (1915-2008) 
Thomas Merton (1915-1968)
Vincent Miceli (1915-1991)
Peter Geach (1916-2013)
Walker Percy (1916-1990) 
Avery Dulles (1918-2008)
G. E. M. Anscombe (1919-2001)
Conrad Baars (1919-1981) 
Emerich Coreth (1919-2006) 
Karol Wojtyła (Pope John Paul II) (1920-2005)
Joseph Fitzmyer (1920-2016)
Catharina Halkes (1920-2011)
Milan Komar (1921-2006)
Thomas Molnar (1921-2010)
Xavier Tilliette (1921-2018)
Leslie Dewart (1922-2009)
Jean Delumeau (1923-2020) 
Jacques Dupuis (1923-2004)
Ernest Fortin (1923-2002) 
Vekoslav Grmič (1923-2005)
René Girard (1923-2015)
Gregory Baum (1923-2017)
Alice von Hildebrand (1923-2022)
Michel de Certeau (1925-1986)
Michael Dummett (1925-2011)
Louis Dupre (1925-2022)
Flannery O’Connor (1925-1964) 
Servais Pinckaers (1925-2008) 
Juan Luis Segundo (1925-1996)
Ivan Illich (1926-2002)
Robert Bork (1927-2012)
Robert Spaemann (1927-2018)
Joseph Ratzinger (Pope Benedict XVI) (1927-2022)
Raymond E. Brown (1928-1998)
Mary Daly (1928-2010)
Gustavo Gutiérrez (1928-)
Hans Kung (1928-2021) 
William E. May (1928-2014)
Jean Vanier (1928-2019)
Nicholas Rescher (1928-)
James V. Schall (1928-2019)
Ralph McInerny (1929-2010)
Alasdair MacIntyre (1929-)
Germain Grisez (1929-2018)
Ignacio Ellacuría (1930-1989)
Joseph A. Bracken (1930-)
C. J. F. Williams (1930-1997)
Charles Taylor (1931-)
Fergus Kerr (1931-)
Ferdinand Ulrich (1931-2020)
Joseph de Torre (1932-2018)
Henri Nouwen (1932-1996)
Walter Kasper (1933-) 
Joan Chittister (1936-)
Michal Heller (1936-)
John Rist (1936-)
Richard John Neuhaus (1936-2009)
Antonin Scalia (1936-2016)
Peter Kreeft (1937-)
Leonardo Boff (1938-)
Jon Sobrino (1938-)
Mariano Artigas (1938-2006)
Elisabeth Schussler Fiorenza (1938-)
David Tracy (1939-)
Joseph A. Komonchak (1939-)
John Finnis (1940-)
Bas van Fraassen (1941-)
Angelo Scola (1941-)
Elizabeth A. Johnson (1941-)
John P. Meier (1942-)
Jacek Salij (1942-)
Ada Maria Isasi-Diaz (1943-2012)
Jean-Luc Marion (1946-)
Thomas Weinandy (1946-)
Chantal Delsol (1947-)
Olavo de Carvalho (1947-2022)
Eleonore Stump (1947-)
Mary Shawn Copeland (1947-)
Tomáš Halík (1948-)
Aidan Nichols (1948-)
Martin Rhonheimer (1950-)
William Desmond (1951-)
Jay Budziszewski (1952-)
Cyril O'Regan (1952-)
Catherine LaCugna (1952-1997)
John Joseph Haldane (1954-)
Tina Beattie (1955-)
Robert P. George (1955-)
William Sweet (1955-)
Marie-Jo Thiel ((1957-)
Gavin D'Costa (1958-)
Robert Barron (1959-)
Yves-Marie Adeline (1960-)
David Oderberg (1963-)
Helen Alford (1964-)
Hector Zagal (1966-)
Józef Stala (1966-)
Denis Moreau (1967-)
Edward Feser (1968-)
Ulrich L. Lehner (1976-)

See also
List of Catholic authors
Doctors of the Church

References
The Cambridge Dictionary of Philosophy, (Second Edition). Cambridge University Press; 1999. 
Encyclopedia of Philosophy (Second Edition). Martin Gale; 2006. 
The Oxford Companion to Philosophy. Oxford University Press; 1995. 
Routledge Encyclopedia of Philosophy. Routledge; 1998. 
Stanford Encyclopedia of Philosophy. January 16, 2010

Catholic
Philosophers
Catholic philosophers